The Order of Good Hope or Order of the Cape of Good Hope is a dormant order of merit of the Republic of South Africa.

History 
The Order of Good Hope was founded in 1973, by the republican government of South Africa, to grant those who had distinguished themselves in the promotion of international relationships and to have sensibilised the general interest towards South Africa. It was abolished in 2002.

President Nelson Mandela had announced his intention to reform the Order. The new South African government saw the Order as a relic of apartheid, above all because the insignia was considered too European (the rays, the colours, the anchor and the Latin motto of the Order. The insignia was also costing the government around 11,000 rand per initiate. In its place was created the Order of the Companions of O. R. Tambo.

Classes 

Awarded to foreign citizens (and, from 1980 to 1988, to South Africans too), for promoting international relations with the increasingly isolated apartheid state. The order was originally divided into five classes:

Grand Collar – for heads of state only.
Grand Cross – for heads of government, ministers of state, judges, presidents of legislatures, secretaries of state, ambassadors, commanders-in-chief, and others.
Grand Officer – for legislators, envoys, senior military officers, and others.
Commander – for chargés d'affaires, consuls-general, colonels, and others.
 Officer – for consuls, lower-ranking military officers, and others.

The order was reorganised in 1988:

Grand Cross – for excellent meritorious service (heads of state and, in special cases, heads of government).
Grand Officer – for outstanding meritorious service (heads of government, ministers of state, judges, presidents of legislatures, secretaries of state, ambassadors, commanders-in-chief, and others).
Commander – for exceptionally meritorious service (legislators, envoys, senior military officers, and others).
Officer – for meritorious service (chargés d'affaires, consuls-general, colonels, and others).
 Member – for exceptional service (consuls, lower-ranking military officers, and others).

Notable recipients of the Grand-Collar (non-exhaustive list) 
 Alfredo Stroessner, President of Paraguay in 1974
 John McCain, United States Senator from Arizona in 1987

Notable recipients of the Grand-Cross (non-exhaustive list) 
Fredrick Chien, Vice Minister of Foreign Affairs of the Republic of China in 1979
Margaret Thatcher, former Prime Minister of the United Kingdom in 1991.
 François Mitterrand, President of France in 1994 
 Robert Mugabe, President of Zimbabwe in 1994 
 Emperor Akihito of Japan in 1995 
 Queen Elizabeth II, Former Queen of South Africa in 1995 
 Zine El Abidine Ben Ali, President of Tunisia in 1995 
 Joaquim Chissano, President of Mozambique in 1995 
 King Mswati III of Swaziland in 1995 
 Sheikh Isa bin Salman Al Khalifa (Bahrain) in 1995 
 Sheikh Zayed bin Sultan Al Nahyan (United Arab Emirates) in 1995 
 Queen Margrethe II of Denmark in 1996 
 Queen Beatrix of the Netherlands in 1996 
 Jacques Chirac, President of France in 1996 
 Sam Nujoma, President of Namibia in 1996 
 Muammar Gaddafi, Brotherly Leader of Libya in 1997 
 Hosni Mubarak, President of Egypt in 1997 
 King Carl XVI Gustaf of Sweden in 1997 
 Martti Ahtisaari, President of Finland in 1997 
 Suharto, President of Indonesia in 1997 
 Yoweri Museveni, President of Uganda in 1997 
 King Harald V of Norway in 1998 
 Bill Clinton, President of the United States of America in 1998 
 Fidel Castro, First Secretary of the Communist Party of Cuba in 1998 
 Yasser Arafat in 1998 
 King Juan Carlos I of Spain in 1999 
 Queen Sofía of Spain in 1999 
 Prince Claus of the Netherlands in 1999 
 Sultan Qaboos bin Said al Said of Oman in 1999 
 Jiang Zemin, General Secretary of the Chinese Communist Party in 1999 
 Boris Yeltsin, President of Russia in 1999

Sources 

 Medals of the world
 South African Government site
 Table of precedence

References 

Orders, decorations, and medals of South Africa

Good Hope, Order of
1973 establishments in South Africa
Awards established in 1973